X-Ten is the tenth album of Blue System. It was published in 1994 by BMG Ariola and produced by Dieter Bohlen. The album contains 11 tracks.

Track listing

Charts

References

External links

Blue System albums
1994 albums
Bertelsmann Music Group albums